Đedović is a rare surname found primarily in Southern Europe, concentrated in Bosnia and Herzegovina.

The following notable people share this surname:

 Dejan Đedović, Serbian futsal coach
 Dubravka Đedović, Serbian politician
 Milenko Đedović, Serbian footballer
 Nedim Đedović, Bosnian basketball player
 Nihad Đedović, Bosnian professional basketball player

See also 

 Nikola Dedović

References